Cumbernauld RFC is a Scottish Rugby Union team based in Cumbernauld, North Lanarkshire, Scotland. Home ground is at Auchenkilns Holdings on the south side of Condorrat.

New Town Sevens

This Sevens tournament was peripatetic around the new towns of Scotland:- East Kilbride, Glenrothes, Cumbernauld, Livingston and Irvine. The town's rugby clubs of East Kilbride RFC, Glenrothes RFC, Cumbernauld RFC, Livingston RFC and Irvine RFC would play in a Sevens tournament to become the New Town Sevens Champions and the Scottish New Towns Cup.

External links
 Official website

References

Scottish rugby union teams
Cumbernauld
Sport in North Lanarkshire
Rugby union in North Lanarkshire